Ernst Friedrich Apelt (3 March 1812 in Reichenau, Saxony – 27 October 1859 in Oppelsdorf, Upper Lusatia, Saxony) was a German philosopher and entrepreneur. He was a student of Jakob Friedrich Fries, succeeding him at the University of Jena. He was the principal contributor to the Abhandlungen der Fries'sche Schule, which he founded with Matthias Jakob Schleiden.

He was also one of the early scholars of the life and work of Johannes Kepler, a precursor of Alexandre Koyré.His son Otto Friedrich Apelt made important contributions to the debate on the nature of the categories of Aristotle.

Works
Metaphysik (1857)

Notes

References
Nick Jardine, "Koyré's Kepler/Kepler's Koyré", History of Science, Vol. 38 (2000), pp. 363–376

1812 births
1859 deaths
People from Bogatynia
People from the Kingdom of Saxony
Historians of science
German male writers